Lizbeth Ángeles Mercado (born 29 June 1990), is a Mexican football forward who currently plays for Pachuca of the Liga MX Femenil.

Prior to turning professional, Ángeles captained Mexico's team at the 2015 edition of the Homeless World Cup. She later worked for the Federal Police before she joined Pachuca in 2017.

References

External links 
 

1990 births
Living people
Women's association football forwards
Liga MX Femenil players
Mexican women's footballers
Footballers from Mexico City
21st-century Mexican women
20th-century Mexican women
Mexican footballers